The molecular formula C11H17N (molar mass : 163.25 g/mol, exact mass : 163.1361) may refer to:

 Dimethylamphetamine
 4-Ethylamphetamine
 Etilamfetamine (N-ethylamphetamine)
 Mephentermine, a cardiac stimulant
 4-Methylmethamphetamine
 4-Methylphenylisobutylamine
 Phenpentermine (Pentorex)
 Xylopropamine